Oxmoor House was the book publishing division of Southern Progress Corporation, which was based in Birmingham, Alabama. Oxmoor House was founded in 1979 when it began publishing Southern Living's Southern Living Annual Recipes. It published books relating to cooking, crafts, holidays, home improvement, and gardening. The company also operated the Sunset Books division for Southern Progress's Sunset magazine. The company maintaind its offices at Southern Progress's Corporate Campus in Birmingham. Meredith Corporation acquired Southern Progress and closed Oxmoor House in 2018.

References

External links
 Oxmoor House
 Southern Progress Corporation

Southern Progress Corporation
Book publishing companies of the United States
Publishing companies established in 1979
Mass media in Birmingham, Alabama
Former Time Warner subsidiaries
Meredith Corporation
IAC (company)